The Ferrari FXX-K is a high performance limited production track day car manufactured by automobile manufacturer Ferrari in Maranello, Italy. Designed by Marco Fainello, Adrián  Méndez and architect Samuel Rodriguez at Centro Stile Ferrari, the FXX-K is based on the street-legal LaFerrari. It succeeds Ferrari's previous developmental track day offerings, the FXX (and the FXX Evo) and the 599XX (along with the 599XX Evo). In 2016, the FXX-K was awarded the Compasso d'Oro industrial design award.

Overview

The "FXX-K" is Ferrari's research and development vehicle based on the brand's first hybrid sports car, the LaFerrari. The K in the new car's name refers to the kinetic energy recovery system (KERS) which is used to maximize performance. The FXX-K is not intended to be used in competition and was developed to give an uncompromising experience to the driver.

The FXX-K was unveiled at the Yas Marina Circuit in late 2014.

Specifications

The V12 engine has been tuned for track use as well as the HY-KERS system.
The car has four driving modes: Qualify (maximum performance on short distance), Long Run (for long-distance driving), Fast Charge (for faster recharging of the battery) and Manual Boost, that uses all of the power of the engine and batteries for maximum torque, cornering and speed. It has F1-based technology, including the E-Diff electronic differential, F1-Trac traction control and racing ABS brakes, all controlled from the centre console (Manettino). Like the preceding FXX and 599XX, the FXX-K is a part of Ferrari's Client Test Driver program, that allows owners of XX cars to drive at special tracks, collecting data for use in future Ferrari road and race cars. The front of the car has a large splitter and twin-profile spoiler, the headlights are very small for improving aerodynamics. On the rear, the tail is higher and includes an electronically operated spoiler with a tail fin and a small wing at the end of each fin to maximize the downforce.

Production
Production of the FXX-K began in 2015 and continued until 2017 with a total of 42 units produced. Like the previous FXX and 599XX, the cars will be kept and maintained by Ferrari and will be available to the owners on track day events.

Marketing
Hublot Manufacture produced MP-05 "LaFerrari" Sapphire hand-wound Tourbillon wristwatches inspired by the FXX-K coupe.

FXX-K Evo

The FXX-K Evo was unveiled at the Ferrari Finali Mondiali 2017 on 28 October 2017 at Stazione Leopolda in Florence during the Ferrari 70th Anniversary celebration. It is an aerodynamic package, available for the existing Ferrari FXX-K. The FXX-K Evo allows the car to produce 23% more downforce than the standard FXX-K and 75% more than the road-legal LaFerrari due to a modified front fascia, a large rear wing and underbody diffusers. Performance and weight figures are unknown but a  decrease in weight is said to estimated by the manufacturer.

On 29 August 2018, the FXX-K Evoluzione (number 54) was shown again to the public during the Formula 1 Milan Festival 2018 led by former Formula 1 driver Giancarlo Fisichella.

References

External links

Ferrari FXX-K Official Website
Ferrari FXX-K Evo Official Website

FXX-K
Rear mid-engine, rear-wheel-drive vehicles
Sports racing cars
Cars introduced in 2015
Hybrid electric cars